Campylobacter lari (formerly Campylobacter laridis) is a species of nalidixic acid-resistant, thermophilic,  microaerophilic bacteria first isolated from human faeces. It shows anaerobic growth in the presence of trimethylamine N-oxide hydrochloride. Its type strain is NCTC 11352. It is commonly found in sea gulls. In humans, it has been involved in cases of enteritis, severe abdominal pain and terminal bacteremia.

See also
Campylobacteriosis

References

External links
Type strain of Campylobacter laridis at BacDive -  the Bacterial Diversity Metadatabase

Campylobacterota
Bacteria described in 1984